Tucker Vorster (born 3 September 1988) is a South African tennis player.

Vorster has a career high ATP singles ranking of 278 achieved on 14 September 2015. He also has a career high ATP doubles ranking of 258 achieved on 15 August 2016.

Playing for South Africa in Davis Cup, Vorster has a W/L record of 2–1.

External links

Ole Miss profile

1988 births
Living people
South African male tennis players
Sportspeople from Pretoria
White South African people